Anampses is a genus of wrasses native to the Indian and Pacific Oceans.

Species
The currently recognized species in this genus are:
 Anampses caeruleopunctatus Rüppell, 1829 (blue-spotted wrasse)
 Anampses chrysocephalus J. E. Randall, 1958 (red-tail wrasse)
 Anampses cuvier Quoy & Gaimard, 1824 (pearl wrasse)
 Anampses elegans J. D. Ogilby, 1889 (elegant wrasse)
 Anampses femininus J. E. Randall, 1972 (blue-striped orange tamarin)
 Anampses geographicus Valenciennes, 1840 (geographic wrasse)
 Anampses lennardi T. D. Scott, 1959 (blue and yellow wrasse)
 Anampses lineatus J. E. Randall, 1972 (lined wrasse)
 Anampses melanurus Bleeker, 1857 (white-spotted wrasse)
 Anampses meleagrides Valenciennes, 1840 (spotted wrasse)
 Anampses neoguinaicus Bleeker, 1878 (New Guinea wrasse)
 Anampses twistii Bleeker, 1856 (yellow-breasted wrasse)

References

 
Labridae
Marine fish genera
Taxa named by Jean René Constant Quoy
Taxa named by Joseph Paul Gaimard